Saddleworth Rangers  are an amateur Rugby League side, formed in 1930, based at Shaw Hall Bank Road, Greenfield, Greater Manchester in the Saddleworth district of Oldham. The club has teams at a number of levels from junior to the first team, which competes in the National Conference League Division One. In 1993 they won the National Conference League Premier Division..

The club's ground, which has hosted Rugby League for over 60 years, features a small covered stand and a new clubhouse which was opened in 2016, fundraising included a world record attempt at a continuous game of touch rugby. The Clubhouse was named in honour of stalwart Terry Flanagan MBE, in a ceremony attended by the then Rugby League Chief Executive Nigel Woods and Chief Operating Office Ralph Rimmer. 
At almost 160m above sea level, the ground is one of the highest in Rugby League.

History
Founder members of BARLA in 1973, and the National Conference League in 1986. History of the National Conference League (this version)

Notable former players

Paddy Kirwan
Joe Greenwood
James Greenwood
Terry Flanagan MBE
Mark Flanagan
Josh Johnson
Richard Russell
Des Foy
Ryan Maneely
Ben White
Jack Bradbury
Nicky Kiss
Terry Fogerty
Alex Givvons
George Ford

Honours

 National Conference League Premier Division
 Winners (1): 1992–93
 Runner Up (1): 1991–92
 National Conference League Division Two
 Winners (1): 1989–90
 BARLA National Cup
 Winners (3): 1990–91, 1992–93, 1993–1994

References

External links
 Saddleworth Rangers Official website
 National Conference League - Saddleworth Rangers

1930 establishments in England
BARLA teams
English rugby league teams
Rugby clubs established in 1930
Rugby league teams in Greater Manchester
Saddleworth
Sport in the Metropolitan Borough of Oldham